Paul Tasch (born November 28, 1910, in New York City, died July 13, 2001, in Wichita, Kansas) was an American paleontologist.

Tasch served in the US Army Signal Corps during World War II.  He graduated from City College of New York with a bachelor's degree in 1948, and from Pennsylvania State University with a master's degree in 1950.  Tasch received his doctorate in 1952 from the State University of Iowa, and was an instructor at the University of Connecticut and from 1953 assistant professor at the North Dakota Agriculture College.  In 1954 he became an associate professor at Moorhead State University and in 1955 professor at Wichita State University.  He retired in 1982.

As a paleontologist, he studied Conchostraca.  He used the paleogeography of fossil clam shrimp in the southern hemisphere (including Antarctica) and the clues that result from it to support the theory of continental drift.  He also did research on fossil bacteria in Permian salt formations, and in the history of geology (especially Charles Darwin and Charles Lyell).

He contributed the Branchiopoda chapter to the Arthropoda volume of the Treatise on Invertebrate Paleontology.

In 1970 he received the Antarctic Service Medal from the US Congress.  Tasch Peak in the Crary Mountains in Antarctica is named after him.

References

1910 births
2001 deaths
American paleontologists
20th-century American scientists
City College of New York alumni
Pennsylvania State University alumni
University of Iowa alumni
Wichita State University faculty
People from New York City
United States Army personnel of World War II